Calliini is a tribe of longhorn beetles of the subfamily Lamiinae.

Taxonomy
 Acreana Lane, 1973
 Alical Galileo, Santos-Silva & Bezark, 2016
 Amucallia Galileo & Martins, 2008
 Anapsicomus Galileo & Martins, 1988
 Ardeocomus Galileo & Martins, 1988
 Asemolea Bates, 1881
 Callia Audinet-Serville, 1835
 Calliomorpha Lane, 1973
 Callisema Martins & Galileo, 1990
 Callityrinthia Galileo & Martins, 1991
 Camitocomus Galileo & Martins, 1991
 Canindea Galileo & Martins, 1990
 Chalcolyne Bates, 1866
 Chereas Thomson, 1864
 Cicatricallia Martins & Galileo, 2012
 Colombicallia Galileo & Martins, 1992
 Drycothaea Thomson, 1868
 Eumathes Pascoe, 1858
 Eumimesis Bates, 1866
 Euryestola Breuning, 1940
 Graminea Thomson, 1864
 Gryllica Thomson, 1860
 Harringtonia Lane, 1973
 Hastatis Buquet, 1857
 Hemicladus Buquet, 1857
 Hemilophopsis Tavakilian & Santos-Silva, 2019
 Hirticallia Galileo & Martins, 1990
 Icelastatis Galileo & Martins, 1991
 Igualda Thomson, 1868
 Lustrocomus Martins & Galileo, 1996
 Mesestola Breuning, 1980
 Micatocomus Galileo & Martins, 1988
 Miguelia Galileo & Martins, 1991
 Mimolaia Bates, 1881
 Nagma Bezark & Santos-Silva, 2020
 Nappella Santos-Silva, Nascimento & Drumont, 2019
 Neocallia Fisher, 1933
 Pandemicus Bezark & Santos-Silva, 2020
 Paracallia Martins & Galileo, 1998
 Paradrycothaea Galileo & Martins, 2010
 Parasemolea Martins & Galileo, 1990
 Rumuara Martins & Galileo, 1990
 Schiacallia Galileo & Martins, 1991
 Xenocallia Galileo & Martins, 1990
 Zenicomus Thomson, 1868

References